The Vet & The Rookie is a collaborative studio album by American rappers 8Ball and Devius. The album was released on October 9, 2007, by 8 Ways Entertainment, Koch Records and RBC Records.

Track listing

Charts

References

2007 albums
8Ball & MJG albums
Collaborative albums